New Hartford is the name of several places in the United States:

New Hartford, Connecticut, a town in Litchfield County
New Hartford, Iowa, a city in Butler County
New Hartford Township, Minnesota, a township in Winona County
New Hartford, Minnesota, an unincorporated community within the town
New Hartford, New York, a town in Oneida County
New Hartford (village), New York, a village within the town

See also 
 Hartford (disambiguation)